Paul Carey (March 15, 1928 – April 12, 2016) was an American broadcaster and sportscaster who broadcast professionally in six different decades. He is a member of the Michigan Sports Hall of Fame.

Early life
Carey was born in Mount Pleasant, Michigan on March 15, 1928. His parents were Joseph P. Carey, a geography professor at Central Michigan University, and Ida B. Carey. He graduated from Mount Pleasant High School in 1946, attended Central Michigan from 1946 to 1948 and then Michigan State University from 1948 to 1950, graduating with a B.A. in Speech, Radio and Dramatics.

His broadcast career was interrupted in 1950 with the outbreak of the Korean War. Carey was drafted in October 1950 and served in the Fourth Infantry Division, the first NATO division. He was a squad leader staff sergeant in a weapons platoon.

Broadcasting career

Carey was on the original announcing staff of WCEN in Mt. Pleasant when it went on the air on August 8, 1949. Later that year, he was part of the first broadcast ever made of a Central Michigan University football game. After completing his education and Army stint, he resumed his announcing and sportscasting duties at WCEN in October 1952. In April 1953, Carey moved to WKNX in Saginaw, Michigan to become the afternoon disc-jockey. He also worked on WKNX-TV and did the first on-camera commercial for that station. During his stay at WKNX, Carey was program director of radio for two years. In June 1956, Carey joined the announcing staff at WJR in Detroit, Michigan and worked there until his retirement in January 1992. He was a staff announcer from 1956 to 1965, and became Assistant Sports Director in 1958. During his tenure, he did pre- and post-game shows for Detroit Lions radio broadcasts; served as a play-by-play announcer for Detroit Pistons basketball for six seasons (1969-70 through 1972-73, 1975–76, and 1981–82); and originated and hosted a Michigan High School football and basketball scoreboard program. He was a member of the Associated Press All-State and ratings panel for 20 years. WJR was the flagship station for the Detroit Tigers Radio Network, and Carey produced the broadcasts for the network from 1964 to 1971.

When Ray Lane moved to television broadcasting, Carey joined Ernie Harwell as a play-by-play announcer for the 1973 season, a position he would maintain for 19 seasons. Except for the last three seasons, he handled engineering duties for the broadcasts as well. In December 1990, Harwell held a press conference to announce that WJR and the Tigers had forced him out of his position, and that the 1991 season would be his last. At the same press conference, Carey announced - in an unrelated decision made several months earlier - that he would retire at the end of the season. His last Tigers broadcast was on the final day of the 1991 season, the final baseball game at Memorial Stadium in Baltimore.  

In 2012, Carey was named the third recipient of the Detroit Sports Broadcaster's Association (DSBA)'s Harwell Lifetime Contribution Award, after Harwell (the Hall of Fame announcer who came to the team in 1960 and announced Tigers' games for 42 seasons) and John Fountain. The award honors an individual from the broadcast industry who has contributed outstanding time and effort to the betterment of sports broadcasting through a lifetime body of work.

Death 
Carey died on April 12, 2016 in Rochester, Michigan from chronic obstructive pulmonary disease (COPD), at the age of 88.

Awards
 Elected to the Michigan Sports Hall of Fame, 1992
 Distinguished Service Award, Michigan High School Coaches Association
 Centennial Award, Central Michigan University, 1993
 Unsung Heroes of Sport Award, 1992
 Big Ed Award, Detroit Chapter of Baseball Writers Association, 1986
 Lowell Thomas Award, Capital Cities Communications, 1985
 Michigan Sportscaster of the Year 6 times, 1970-71-72-76-85-89.
 Detroit Catholic League Hall of Fame, 1995
 Basketball Coaches Assn. of Michigan Hall of Honor, 1997
 Honorary Lifetime Member of Detroit Sports Broadcasters Association (DSBA)
 Honorary Member of Detroit Tigers Alumni Association
 Dick Schaap Memorial Award
 Doc Fenkell Excellence in Media Award
 Ernie Harwell DSBA Lifetime Contribution Award

Notes and references
 "Strictly Professional/Ernie and Paul"- Detroit Free Press, September 19, 1984
 "Ernie and Paul Together..." Detroit Free Press, April 5, 1987
 "Harwell's Streak Ends", Detroit Free Press, April 25, 1989
 "The Tigers' Utility Voice", Detroit Free Press, June 24, 1990
 "Carey Leaving on Own", Detroit Free Press, December 20, 1990
 "Toronto Sends its Love..." Detroit Free Press, August 9, 1991
 "Tigers, WJR to Honor Ernie & Paul" Detroit Free Press, September 4, 1991

References

1928 births
2016 deaths
United States Army personnel of the Korean War
American radio sports announcers
Central Michigan University alumni
Respiratory disease deaths in Michigan
Deaths from chronic obstructive pulmonary disease
Detroit Lions announcers
Detroit Pistons announcers
Detroit Tigers announcers
Major League Baseball broadcasters
Michigan State University alumni
National Basketball Association broadcasters
National Football League announcers
People from Mount Pleasant, Michigan